Victor David Hahn was a missionary who served in India during 1955–1968 through the Canadian Baptist Ministries.

Hahn pursued theological studies at the McMaster University taking a B.D. in 1953.  For postgraduate studies, Hahn studied at the Andover Newton Theological School where he took an S.T.M.

Career

India
During Hahn's ministry in Andhra Pradesh, India during 1955–1968, he served as a Baptist missionary along the coast of Andhra Pradesh in the Churches of the Convention of Baptist Churches of Northern Circars and later became Principal of the residual Baptist Theological Seminary, Kakinada during 1964–1966 succeeding Waldo Penner.  After a two-year stint at the Seminary, Victor Hahn resigned in 1966 citing health reasons leading to the appointment of Paul Antrobus by the Seminary Council of the Baptist Theological Seminary, Kakinada.

Canada
Hahn left India in 1968 and continued to serve the Canadian Baptist Ministries and was in charge of missionary housing in Hamilton and Ontario.  Hahn later settled at Oakville, Ontario and also taught elementary students (grades 3 to 5) at Oakwood Public School, Oakville where his methods of teaching inspired many.  One among his students was Amir Hussain who acknowledges the inspiration from the elementary school classes taught by Victor Hahn.

References

20th-century Canadian Baptist ministers
Baptist writers
McMaster University alumni
Andover Newton Theological School alumni
Telugu people
Christian clergy from Andhra Pradesh
Indian Christian theologians
Indian Baptists
Canadian Baptist Ministries missionaries in India
Academic staff of the Senate of Serampore College (University)
Convention of Baptist Churches of Northern Circars pastors
Year of birth missing
Year of death missing